Streniastis is a genus of moth in the family Gelechiidae.

Species
 Streniastis composita Meyrick, 1922
 Streniastis thermaea Lower, 1897

References

Dichomeridinae